Mary Hay may refer to:

 Mary Hay, 14th Countess of Erroll (died 1758)
 Mary Hay (actress) (1901–1957), American dancer, actress, playwright and former Ziegfeld girl
 Mary Garrett Hay (1857–1928), American suffragist
 Mary Cecil Hay (1840/41–1886), English novelist